The 2017–18 season was Real Madrid Club de Fútbol's 114th season in existence and the club's 87th consecutive season in the top flight of Spanish football. It covered a period from 1 July 2017 to 30 June 2018.

Despite finishing a distant third in the league that season, Real Madrid won four trophies out of six possible, including an unprecedented third consecutive Champions League title, which made them the first team to achieve the feat since Bayern Munich in 1976. This was also Madrid's fourth European Cup in five years, and their 13th overall. The threepeat-winning manager Zinedine Zidane resigned shortly after the season concluded; he would return by the end of next season.

The season was the first since 2006–07 without Pepe, who departed to Besiktas.

Summary

Pre-season
Theo Hernandez and Dani Ceballos joined Madrid on 5 and 14 July 2017.

Pepe went to Beşiktaş after his contract was up after the last season. James Rodríguez and Fábio Coentrão were loaned to Bayern Munich and Sporting CP respectively.

Mariano Díaz was transferred to Lyon. On 21 July, Álvaro Morata moved to Chelsea. Two days later, Danilo left Madrid and joined Manchester City.

August
On 8 August 2017, Madrid won the 2017 UEFA Super Cup, beating Manchester United 2–1 with goals from Casemiro and Isco.

On 13 August 2017, Madrid won the away leg of the 2017 Supercopa de España, defeating Barcelona 3–1 with goals from Cristiano Ronaldo, Marco Asensio and an own goal. The match was controversial, as several referring mistakes affected the teams. First, Barcelona was awarded a questionable penalty on Luis Suárez, which Messi converted to equalize in the 77th minute, and then, after Real scored their second via substitute Ronaldo, who shot into the top right corner from the edge of the box in the 80th minute, Cristiano was booked for removing his shirt as part of the celebration; two minutes later, he was booked again by the referee for allegedly diving when he collided with Samuel Umtiti in the box, which resulted in a second yellow card and Ronaldo being sent off, therefore getting suspended for the second leg. He was later given a five-match suspension after replays showed him push the referee in frustration for the red card. The latter penalty in hindsight derailed Madrid's season start and cost them points in La Liga. Real's last goal was scored in the 90th minute in similar fashion to the second, as Asensio shot into the top left corner following an assist from Lucas Vázquez.

Three days later, on 16 August 2017, Madrid clinched the title, after a 2–0 home win (5–1 on aggregate) with goals from Asensio and Karim Benzema. Goals from Gareth Bale, Casemiro and Toni Kroos gave Madrid a 3–0 winning start in the league campaign at Deportivo La Coruña on 20 August 2017. On 24 August 2017, the 2017–18 UEFA Champions League group stage draw was held, and Madrid was drawn in Group H, along with Borussia Dortmund, Tottenham Hotspur and APOEL. On 27 August 2017, two goals from Asensio were not enough as Madrid drew Valencia 2–2 at the Bernabéu.

September
The new month started with a 1–1 home draw with Levante after Lucas Vázquez scored the equalizer for Madrid.

Marcelo signed a new contract on 13 September, keeping him at the club until the summer of 2022. The same day, Madrid kicked off the new Champions League season with a 3–0 victory over APOEL, with a brace from Ronaldo and a goal from Sergio Ramos. A day later, Isco renewed his contract until 2022. The contract from Dani Carvajal was extended to 2022 on 17 September 2017. Later that day, Madrid got a 3–1 victory at Real Sociedad after goals from Borja Mayoral, Bale and an own goal. Because of the first goal, Madrid scored in their 73rd consecutive match, equalling the record set by Santos FC in 1963. The contract of Benzema was extended until 2021 on 20 September 2017. On the same day, Madrid lost to Real Betis 0–1, conceding a late goal. The defeat also ended their goalscoring streak. Marcos Llorente's contract was extended until 2021 on 23 September 2017. A brace from Ceballos secured Madrid a 2–1 win over Alavés on the same day. Madrid produced a comprehensive 3–1 away victory against Borussia Dortmund in the Champions League just three days later, with a brace from Ronaldo and another goal from Bale. A day later, Raphaël Varane's contract was extended until 2022. On 28 September 2017, Asensio's contract was extended until 2023.

October
A brace from Isco helped Madrid to defeat Espanyol 2–0 on the first day of the month. On 14 October 2017, a late winner from Ronaldo secured a 2–1 victory at Getafe after Benzema initially gave Madrid the lead. Three days later, against Tottenham Hotspur, a goal from Ronaldo was not enough as the game ended in a 1–1 draw. Goals from Asensio, Marcelo and an own goal gave Madrid a 3–0 win over Eibar on 22 October 2017. On 26 October 2017, two converted penalties by Asensio and Vázquez saw Madrid kick off the Copa del Rey season with a 2–0 away win in the first leg against Fuenlabrada. A goal from Isco was not enough as Madrid lost to Girona, which ended their 13-game winning streak away from home.

November
On the first day of the new month, Madrid lost 1–3 against Tottenham in the Champions League, to concede their second consecutive loss. A late goal from Ronaldo was not enough. The next league match, on 5 November 2017, was won 3–0 against Las Palmas with goals from Casemiro, Asensio and Isco.

On 18 November 2017, the Madrid derby ended in a goalless draw. Madrid booked their place in the Champions League knockout stage after a 6–0 away victory over APOEL, with braces from Benzema and Ronaldo plus goals from Luka Modrić and Nacho on 21 November 2017. Four days later, Málaga CF was defeated after goals from Benzema, Casemiro and Ronaldo, 3–2. The return leg of the Copa del Rey tie against Fuenlabrada, on 28 November 2017, ended in a 2–2 draw with both goals coming from Mayoral. The aggregate score was 4–2 in favour of Madrid who advanced to the next round.

December
On the second day of the month, Madrid travelled to Bilbao and came up short with a 0–0 draw. Four days later, the last group stage match saw Madrid taking on Borussia Dortmund. Goals from Mayoral, Ronaldo and Vázquez gave Real a 3–2 victory. Ronaldo also set a competition record, having scored in every group stage match. Three days later, on 9 December, Madrid won 5–0 against Sevilla, with a brace from Ronaldo and goals from Nacho, Kroos and Achraf Hakimi, who all scored in the first half. On 13 December 2017, the semi-final in the 2017 FIFA Club World Cup against Al Jazira was won 2–1 by goals from Ronaldo and Bale. Three days later, Madrid won the tournament after a 1–0 final victory over Grêmio, with Ronaldo scoring the decisive goal from a spectacular free kick. Back in Spain, El Clásico ended in a 0–3 defeat on 23 December 2017.

January
The new year started just four days in, with a Copa del Rey round of 16 first leg against Numancia. The game ended in a 3–0 win after goals from Bale, Isco and Mayoral. On 7 January 2018, the match against Celta Vigo ended in a 2–2 draw, with a brace from Bale. Three days later, a brace from Vázquez in a 2–2 draw in the return leg of the Copa del Rey against Numnacia was enough for Madrid to advance to the quarter-finals, thanks to a 5–2 aggregate win. On 13 January 2018, Madrid lost 0–1 against Villarreal, conceding a late goal. A goal from Asensio gave Madrid a 1–0 advantage after the first leg of the Copa del Rey quarter-finals against Leganés on 18 January 2018. Three days later, braces from Nacho, Bale and Ronaldo, plus a goal from Modrić, secured Madrid a resounding 7–1 victory over Deportivo La Coruña. Madrid was eliminated from the Copa del Rey on 24 January 2018, after they lost the second leg against Leganés 1–2, despite a goal from Benzema. Leganés advanced on the away goals rule, with the aggregate score being tied 2–2. The next weekend, on 27 January 2018, Madrid went on to win 4–1 at Valencia after a brace from Ronaldo and goals from Marcelo and Kroos.

February
On 3 February 2018, Madrid travelled to Levante and came away with a 2–2 draw, despite having been in front twice after goals from Ramos and Isco. A hat-trick from Ronaldo and goals from Vázquez and Kroos gave Madrid a 5–2 victory against Real Sociedad, a week later. The first leg of the Champions League round of 16 against Paris Saint-Germain on 14 February 2018 was won 3–1 after a brace from Ronaldo and a goal from Marcelo. Four days later, two goals from Asensio and goals from Ramos, Ronaldo and Benzema secured Madrid a 5–3 win over Real Betis. Against Leganés, on 21 February 2018, Madrid won 3–1 after goals from Vázquez, Casemiro and Ramos. Just three days later, a brace from Ronaldo and goals from Bale and Benzema secured Real a 4–0 win over Alavés. The away game at Espanyol was lost 0–1 after an injury-time goal on 27 February 2018.

March
On 3 March 2018, a brace from Ronaldo and a goal from Bale helped Madrid to get a 3–1 win over Getafe. Three days later, the return leg of the UEFA Champions League round of 16 tie against Paris Saint-Germain was won 2–1 after goals from Ronaldo and Casemiro. That result gave Madrid a 5–2 advantage over the two legs. Another four days later, a brace from Ronaldo secured Real all three points in a 2–1 away win at Eibar. On 18 March 2018, Madrid defeated Girona 6–3 at home with four goals from Ronaldo and singles from Vázquez and Bale. On the last day of March, a brace from Bale and a goal from Benzema helped Real to record a fifth consecutive victory with a 3–0 win at Las Palmas.

April
On 3 April 2018, in the Champions League quarter-finals against Juventus, Ronaldo scored twice, including a spectacular overhead kick, and Marcelo added another goal to give Madrid a 3–0 first leg victory. Five days later, a volley goal from Ronaldo put Madrid in the lead against Atlético, but the match eventually ended 1–1. On 11 April 2018, down 0–3, Ronaldo converted an injury time penalty to secure Madrid a spot in the semi-finals of the Champions League; the 1–3 loss was enough as Real won 4–3 on aggregate against Juventus. Four days later, goals from Isco and Casemiro secured a 2–1 win over Málaga. A late Ronaldo equalizer got Madrid a 1–1 draw against Athletic Bilbao on 18 April 2018. A week later, against Bayern Munich in the semi-finals of the Champions League, Madrid got a 2–1 away leg win after goals from Marcelo and Asensio. On 28 April 2018, the game against Leganés was won 2–1 with goals from Bale and Mayoral.

May
A brace from Benzema against Bayern Munich helped Madrid to reach the final after the second leg ended in a 2–2 draw on 1 May 2018, which secured a 4–3 aggregate victory. The Clásico, five days later, ended in a 2–2 draw with goals from Ronaldo and Bale. Just three days later, on 9 May 2018, Madrid lost 2–3 at Sevilla with late goals from Mayoral and Ramos. Three days later, Madrid won 6–0 against Celta Vigo, with Bale scoring a brace and Isco, Hakimi, Kroos and an own goal chipping in the other goals. The last game of the league season, on 19 May 2018, ended in a 2–2 away draw against Villarreal, after goals from Bale and Ronaldo initially gave Madrid the lead. On 26 May 2018, two goals from Bale and another one from Benzema helped Madrid to win their third consecutive Champions League title, and fourth in five years, after defeating Liverpool 3–1.

Squad

Transfers

In

Total spending:  €40.5M

Out

Total income:  €141M
Net income:  €100.5M

Pre-season and friendlies

Competitions
Times from 1 July to 29 October 2017 and from 25 March to 30 June 2018 are UTC+2, from 30 October 2017 to 25 March 2018 UTC+1.

Overview

La Liga

League table

Results summary

Result round by round

Matches

Copa del Rey

Round of 32

Round of 16

Quarter-finals

Supercopa de España

UEFA Champions League

Madrid joined the competition in the group stage.

Group stage

Knockout phase

Round of 16

Quarter-finals

Semi-finals

Final

UEFA Super Cup

FIFA Club World Cup

Madrid joined the competition in the semi-finals.

Statistics

Squad statistics

|}

Goals

1 Includes 2017 UEFA Super Cup, 2017 Supercopa de España and 2017 FIFA Club World Cup.

Clean sheets

1 Includes 2017 UEFA Super Cup, 2017 Supercopa de España and 2017 FIFA Club World Cup.

Disciplinary record

1 Includes 2017 UEFA Super Cup, 2017 Supercopa de España and 2017 FIFA Club World Cup.

References

External links

Real Madrid CF seasons
Real Madrid
Real Madrid
Real Madrid
Real Madrid
UEFA Champions League-winning seasons
FIFA Club World Cup-winning seasons